The sailing competitions at the 2013 Mediterranean Games in Mersin took place between 21 June and 27 June in front of the Mersin Marina.

Athletes competed in four Olympic classes.

Schedule

Medal summary

Medal table
Key:

Men's events

Women's events

References

Sports at the 2013 Mediterranean Games
2013
2013 in sailing
Sailing competitions in Turkey